So Romantic is the seventh studio album by American singer Evelyn "Champagne" King, released on October 16, 1984 by RCA Records. It was produced by Clif Magness, Glen Ballard, Carl Sturken, Evan Rogers, Hawk, Jimmy Douglass, and the System.

The album peaked at No. 38 on the U.S. Billboard Top R&B/Hip-Hop Albums chart. It featured the hit singles "Just for the Night", "I'm So Romantic", "Out of Control", "Give Me One Reason", and "Till Midnight". The album was digitally remastered and reissued on CD with bonus tracks in 2014 by Funky Town Grooves Records.

Critical reception

In a retrospective review for AllMusic, critic Justin Kantor wrote of the album, "the overall sound is very solid with an adept mixture of live instrumentation and synthesizers. With King's bold vocals atop them, the songs on So Romantic make it one of her strongest '80s albums."

Track listing

Charts

Singles

References

External links

1984 albums
Evelyn "Champagne" King albums
Albums produced by Glen Ballard
Albums produced by Carl Sturken and Evan Rogers
RCA Records albums